Kaley may refer to:
 Kaley Cuoco (born 1985), American actress
 Kaley Fountain (born 1988), American soccer player
 Kaley, Iran, or Kalley, a village in Kermanshah Province, Iran
 John R. Kaley (1918-2005), American businessman and politician

See also
Caylee (name), given name
Cayley (disambiguation)
Kayleigh (disambiguation)